Hagey Ridge is a high snow-covered ridge, between the Björnert Cliffs and Johnson Glacier, forming the east end of the McDonald Heights on the coast of Marie Byrd Land, Antarctica. The ridge was first photographed from an aircraft of the U.S. Antarctic Service in December 1940. It was mapped by the United States Geological Survey from surveys and U.S. Navy air photos, 1959–66, and was named by the Advisory Committee on Antarctic Names for Lieutenant Donald W. Hagey, U.S. Navy, Officer-in-Charge at Byrd Station in 1969.

References

Ridges of Marie Byrd Land